2-Chloroethyl ethyl sulfide is the organosulfur compound with the formula C2H5SC2H4Cl.  It is a colorless liquid. The compound is part of the family of vesicant compounds known as half mustards, has been heavily investigated because of its structural similarity to the sulfur mustard S(C2H4Cl)2.  The LD50s of the half and full mustard are 252 and 2.4 mg/kg (oral, rats).

References

Sulfur mustards
Organochlorides